Into the Wild is a 2007 American biographical adventure drama film written, co-produced, and directed by Sean Penn. It is an adaptation of the 1996 non-fiction book of the same name written by Jon Krakauer and tells the story of Christopher McCandless ("Alexander Supertramp"), a man who hiked across North America into the Alaskan wilderness in the early 1990s. The film stars Emile Hirsch as McCandless, Marcia Gay Harden as his mother, William Hurt as his father, Jena Malone, Catherine Keener, Brian H. Dierker, Vince Vaughn, Kristen Stewart, and Hal Holbrook.

The film premiered during the 2007 Rome Film Fest and opened outside Fairbanks, Alaska, on September 21, 2007. It received critical acclaim and grossed $56 million worldwide. It was nominated for two Golden Globes and won the award for Best Original Song: "Guaranteed" by Eddie Vedder. It was also nominated for two Academy Awards: Best Editing and Best Supporting Actor for Holbrook.

Plot
In April 1992, Christopher McCandless arrives in a remote area called Healy, just north of Denali National Park and Preserve in Alaska. Noting McCandless' unpreparedness, the man who drops him off gives him gumboots. 

McCandless sets up camp in an abandoned city bus that he calls "The Magic Bus". He is content with the isolation, the beauty of nature, and the thrill of living off the land. He hunts with a .22, reads books, and keeps a journal as he prepares his new life in the wild.

Flashback
In May 1990, McCandless graduates with high honors from Emory University. He is disenchanted with modern society after discovering he and his sister Carine were born out of wedlock. 

McCandless destroys his credit cards and identification, donates his savings to Oxfam and sets out on a cross-country drive in his Datsun 210 to experience life in the wilderness. He does not tell his parents nor Carine what he is doing or where he is going and does not contact them after his departure. This causes his parents to become increasingly anxious.

At Lake Mead, McCandless' car is caught in a flash flood; he abandons it and begins hitchhiking. Burning what remains of his cash, he assumes the name "Alexander Supertramp". In Northern California, McCandless encounters hippie couple Jan and Rainey. Rainey tells him his relationship with Jan is failing, which McCandless helps rekindle. 

In September, McCandless arrives in Carthage, South Dakota, and works for a contract harvesting company owned by Wayne Westerberg. He leaves after Westerberg is arrested for satellite piracy.

McCandless kayaks down the Colorado River and, though told by park rangers he may not do so without a license, ignores their warnings and goes downriver to Mexico. His kayak is lost in a dust storm, and he crosses back into the United States on foot. Unable to hitch a ride, he jumps on freight trains to Los Angeles. Not long after arriving, however, he starts feeling "corrupted" by modern civilization and leaves. He is forced to resume hitchhiking when railroad police catch and beat him.

In December 1991, McCandless arrives at Slab City, in the Imperial Valley, and encounters Jan and Rainey again. He also meets Tracy Tatro, a teenage girl who shows interest in him, but he turns her down because she is a minor. After the holidays, McCandless continues heading for Alaska. 

One month later, camping near Salton City, McCandless meets Ron Franz, a retired widower who lost his family in a car accident while he was serving in the United States Army. He leads a lonely life in a workshop as a leather worker. Franz teaches McCandless leatherwork, resulting in the making of a belt detailing his travels. 

After two months with Franz, McCandless decides to leave for Alaska. Franz gives McCandless his old camping and travel gear, along with an offer to adopt him as his grandchild. McCandless tells him they should discuss it after he returns from Alaska.

Flashforward
Four months later, at the abandoned bus, life for McCandless becomes harder, and he makes several poor decisions. Trying to live off the land, he hunts down a large moose with his rifle, but cannot preserve the meat and it spoils within days. As his supplies dwindle, he realizes that nature can be harsh.

McCandless concludes that true happiness can be found only when shared with others, and he seeks to return from the wild to his friends and family. However, he finds that the stream he crossed during the winter has become wide, deep, and violent due to the thaw, and he is unable to cross. Defeated, he returns to the bus. 

In a desperate act, McCandless gathers and eats roots and plants. He confuses similar plants and eats a poisonous one, falling sick as a result. Slowly dying, he continues to document his process of self-realization, and imagines what it might have been like if he had managed to return to his family. He writes a farewell note to the world and crawls into his sleeping bag to die.

Two weeks later, moose hunters find his body. Shortly afterwards, Carine returns to Virginia with her brother's ashes in her backpack.

Cast

Production
The scenes of graduation from Emory University in the film were shot in late 2006 on the front lawn of Reed College. Some of the graduation scenes were also filmed during the actual Emory University graduation on May 15, 2006. Filming at the actual bus would have been too remote for the technical demands of a movie shoot. A replica bus used in the movie is now a tourist attraction at a restaurant in Healy, Alaska.

Brian Dierker, who plays a major supporting role in the film as Rainey, had no previous acting experience and became involved in the production to be a guide for the rafting scenes.

Release

Critical response
The review aggregator Rotten Tomatoes reports that 83% of 200 reviews of the film were positive, with an average rating of 7.50/10. The site's critics consensus reads: "With his sturdy cast and confident direction, Sean Penn has turned a complex work of nonfiction like Into the Wild into an accessible and poignant character study." Metacritic assigned the film an average score of 73 out of 100 based on 38 critics, indicating "generally favorable reviews".

Roger Ebert of the Chicago Sun-Times gave the film four stars out of four and described it as "spellbinding". Ebert wrote that Emile Hirsch gives a "hypnotic performance", commenting: "It is great acting, and more than acting." Ebert added, "The movie is so good partly because it means so much, I think, to its writer-director, Sean Penn."

Accolades

Wins

 65th Golden Globe Awards
 Best Original Song – Motion Picture ("Guaranteed")
 Gotham Awards
 Best Feature Film
 Mill Valley Film Festival
 Best Actor (Emile Hirsch)
 Palm Springs International Film Festival
 Director of the Year Award (Sean Penn)
 Rising Star Award Actor (Emile Hirsch)
 National Board of Review
 Breakthrough Performance – Male (Emile Hirsch)
 Rome Film Festival
 Jury Award (William Pohlad), (Art Linson), (Sean Penn)
 São Paulo International Film Festival
 Best Foreign Language Film (Sean Penn)

Nominations

 80th Academy Awards
 Best Supporting Actor (Hal Holbrook)
 Best Film Editing (Jay Cassidy)
 65th Golden Globe Awards
 Best Original Score – Motion Picture (Michael Brook, Kaki King, Eddie Vedder)
 American Cinema Editors
 Best Edited Feature Film – Dramatic (Jay Cassidy)
 Broadcast Film Critics Association
 Best Film
 Best Actor (Emile Hirsch)
 Best Supporting Actor (Hal Holbrook)
 Best Supporting Actress (Catherine Keener)
 Best Director (Sean Penn)
 Best Writer (Sean Penn)
 Best Song ("Guaranteed")
 34th César Awards
 Best Foreign Film
 Chicago Film Critics Association Awards
 Best Picture
 Best Screenplay – Adapted (Sean Penn)
 Best Supporting Actor (Hal Holbrook)
 Directors Guild of America Awards
 Best Director – Film (Sean Penn)
 Cinema Audio Society
 Outstanding Achievement in Sound Mixing for Motion Pictures
 Costume Designers Guild Awards
 Excellence in Costume Design for Film – Contemporary
 Film Critics Circle of Australia Awards
 Best Foreign Film – English Language (Sean Penn)
 Grammy Awards
 Best Song Written for Motion Picture, Television or Other Visual Media ("Guaranteed")
 Gotham Awards
 Breakthrough Actor (Emile Hirsch)
 Satellite Awards
 Best Original Song ("Rise")
 Screen Actors Guild Awards
 Outstanding Performance by a Cast in a Motion Picture
 Outstanding Performance by a Male Actor in a Leading Role (Emile Hirsch)
 Outstanding Performance by a Male Actor in a Supporting Role (Hal Holbrook)
 Outstanding Performance by a Female Actor in a Supporting Role (Catherine Keener)
 USC Scripter Award
 USC Scripter Award (Sean Penn) (screenwriter), (Jon Krakauer) (author)
 Writers Guild of America Awards
 Best Adapted Screenplay (Sean Penn)

Top ten lists
The American Film Institute listed the film as one of ten AFI Movies of the Year for 2007.

National Board of Review named it one of the Top Ten Films of the Year.

Into the Wild also ranks 473rd in Empire magazine's 2008 list of the 500 greatest movies of all time.

The film appeared on many critics' top ten lists of the best films of 2007.

 1st: Ben Lyons, The Daily 10
 2nd: Ann Hornaday, The Washington Post
 2nd: Tasha Robinson, The A.V. Club
 3rd: James Berardinelli, ReelViews
 3rd: Kevin Crust, Los Angeles Times
 3rd: Peter Travers, Rolling Stone
 4th: Kyle Smith, New York Post
 5th: Claudia Puig, USA Today
 5th: David Germain, Associated Press
 5th: Joe Morgenstern, The Wall Street Journal
 6th: Carrie Rickey, The Philadelphia Inquirer
 6th: Steven Rea, The Philadelphia Inquirer
 7th: A.O. Scott, The New York Times (tied with The Diving Bell and the Butterfly)
 7th: Noel Murray, The A.V. Club
 9th: Christy Lemire, Associated Press
 10th: Roger Ebert, Chicago Sun-Times

Box office
In North America, Into the Wild initially opened in limited release in four theaters and grossed $212,440, posting a per-theater average of $53,110. For the next several weeks, the film remained in limited release until it expanded to over 600 theaters on October 19, 2007; in its first weekend of wide release, the film grossed just $2.1 million for a per-theater average of $3,249. As of December 25, 2008, the film grossed $18,354,356 domestically and $37,281,398 internationally. In total, the film has grossed $55,635,754 worldwide.

Home media
Into the Wild was released on March 4, 2008, on standard DVD, Two-Disc Special Collector's Edition DVD, and standard HD DVD. The special edition DVD and HD DVD contain two special features entitled The Story, The Characters and The Experience. The Blu-ray Disc edition was released in France on July 16, 2008. The Blu-ray edition for the US was released on December 16, 2008.

Soundtrack

The songs on the soundtrack were performed by Eddie Vedder, lead singer of Pearl Jam, and Jerry Hannan. Vedder won a Golden Globe for Best Original Song for the song "Guaranteed". The score was written and performed by Michael Brook and Kaki King.  The music at the end of the theatrical trailer is "Acts of Courage" by X-Ray Dog, a company that supplies music for many movie trailers. Eddie Vedder said whilst writing the songs on the album "I spent three days giving him (Sean Penn) colors that I could paint with. Different sounds. It would be pump organ and vocal, or it would be an uptempo song. I just gave him 25 minutes of music, stuff I felt that were colors on the palette. And I really didn't think anything was gonna come out of it. Maybe a little piece or something".

Aftermath
The abandoned and decaying bus on the Stampede Trail where McCandless died became a pilgrimage destination for fans. In the 1940s, a road crew had taken the bus to a remote trail in Denali Borough, Alaska, 30 miles (50 km) from the nearest town, according to Denali Borough Mayor, Clay Walker. Visitors had to cross the dangerous Teklanika River. In 2010, a Swiss woman drowned. In 2019, a newlywed Belarusian woman drowned in the swollen river on her way to the site. Five Italians were rescued in February 2020, with one suffering from severe frostbite, and a stranded Brazilian was rescued in April 2020. In total, 15 search and rescue operations for visitors were carried out between 2009 and 2017.

On June 18, 2020, the bus was removed due to public safety concerns. It was air-lifted by a US army Chinook helicopter to an undisclosed location pending a decision about its final destination. On September 24, 2020, the Museum of The North at the University of Alaska (Fairbanks) announced that it had become the permanent home of Magic Bus 142, to be restored for an outdoor exhibit.

See also
 The Call of the Wild, a 2007 documentary about McCandless made by Ron Lamothe
 Grizzly Man, a 2005 documentary about a man who perished in the Alaskan wilderness at the mouth of a bear
 Wild, 2014 film about a woman's trek across the Pacific Crest Trail
 Survival film, about the film genre, with a list of related films
 Vagabond, a 1985 French film that deals with a similar theme
 Nomadland

References

External links

 

2007 films
2007 biographical drama films
2007 independent films
2000s adventure drama films
American biographical drama films
American independent films
American adventure drama films
American nonlinear narrative films
American docudrama films
Drama films based on actual events
Environmental films
Films about buses
Films based on non-fiction books
Films directed by Sean Penn
Films produced by Art Linson
Films scored by Michael Brook
Films set in 1990
Films set in 1991
Films set in 1992
Films set in Alaska
Films set in Arizona
Films set in Atlanta
Films set in California
Films set in Los Angeles
Films set in Mexico
Films set in Nevada
Films set in South Dakota
Films set in Virginia
Films shot in Alaska
Films shot in Arizona
Films shot in Atlanta
Films shot in California
Films shot in Mexico
Films shot in Nevada
Films shot in Oregon
Films shot in South Dakota
Journalism adapted into films
Paramount Vantage films
2007 drama films
2000s English-language films
2000s American films
Films about camping